Being one of the oldest suburbs of Melbourne, Australia, Brunswick has a large number of places of heritage significance, in the form of individual buildings as well as urban conservation precincts covering entire streets or substantial parts of them.

Victorian Heritage Register listings 

The Victorian Heritage Register has listings for the following places in Brunswick:
 H0665	Iron House, 189 Brunswick Road Brunswick
 H1153	Iron Cottage, 187 Brunswick Road Brunswick
 H1152	Iron Cottage, 183 Brunswick Road Brunswick
 H1151	Iron Cottage, 181 Brunswick Road Brunswick
 H1307	Former Brunswick Market, 1-9 Ballarat Street Brunswick
 H1219	Residence, 120 Stewart Street Brunswick
 H0916	Brunswick Fire Station And Flats, 24 Blyth Street Brunswick
 H0594	Cottage, 130 Barkly Street, Brunswick
 		South Brunswick Brickworks
 H1285	Former Ferry Terra Cotta And Enamelled Brickworks Office, 310 Albert Street Brunswick
 H2027	Former Brunswick Gas & Coke Company Retort House, 21-35 Hope Street Brunswick
 H1144	Former Wesleyan Church And Model Sunday School, 340-350 Sydney Road Brunswick (now the Sydney Road Community School)
 H0756	Former Presbyterian Church Buildings, 212 Sydney Road Brunswick (now the Uniting Church and Asylum Seeker Welcome Centre)
 H1296	Hoopers Store, 463-475 Sydney Road Brunswick (now the Hardwick Building)
 H0129	Christ Church, 10 Glenlyon Road Brunswick
 H1289	Former Australian Liquorice Factory Chimney And Fire Tunnel Remains, 342- 348 Victoria Street, Brunswick
 H0703 Former Hoffman Brickworks, 72-106 Dawson Street Brunswick
 H0952	Upfield Railway Line Precinct, Brunswick, Parkville and Coburg
 H0705	Former Melvilles Grain Store,1-7 And 9-17 Colebrook Street, Brunswick
 		Wales Quarry Brunswick
 H2026	Craig & Seeley Offices And Showroom, Hope Street And Percy Street, Brunswick

Heritage Overlays in the planning scheme 
The Moreland planning scheme contains 244 individual Heritage Overlays, of which over 100 are located in Brunswick, many of them covering sizable urban conservation precincts. The most substantial or notable of these heritage places not covered by the Victorian Heritage Register include:

 HO1      Albert Street Precinct
 HO24    Blyth Street Precinct
 HO30    Brickworks and Berry Street Precinct
 HO32    Brunswick Road Precinct
 HO46    7-9 Cassells Road & 64-72 Tinning Street, former Downs Ropeworks
 HO51    Collier Crescent Precinct
 HO66    De Carle Street/Bishop Street Precinct
 HO68    Donald Street Precinct
 HO73    Edward Street Precinct
 HO75    Ewing Street Precinct
 HO76    First Avenue Precinct
 HO77    Frederick Street Precinct
 HO93    Hope Street Precinct
 HO96    181-185 & 272 Hope Street, Church, Manse, School and Convent
 HO108  Lyle Street Precinct
 HO129  Overend Street Precinct
 HO130  Park Street Precinct
 HO139  Phillipstown Precinct - Barkly Street/Union Street
 HO149  Sydney Road Precinct
 HO148  195A-197 Stewart Street, Brunswick East Primary School
 HO151  199-207 Sydney Road - former Lyric Theatre (now the site of the Brunswick Club)
 HO153  233 Sydney Road - former Brunswick Town Hall
 HO154  270 Sydney Road - former Mechanics Institute (now arts administration and performing arts space)
 HO155  289 Sydney Road & 1-3 Dawson Street - St. Ambrose Church, School and Hall
 HO156  337-341 Sydney Road, former Cumberland Arms Hotel (now an apartment building)
 HO160  430 Sydney Road, Duke of Edinburgh Hotel
 HO162  Sydney Road, Baptist Church
 HO167  523-527 Sydney Road, Independent Church
 HO170  715-719 Sydney Road, Don Bosco Youth Centre
 HO171  807-813 Sydney Road, Tram Depot
 HO181  158-162 Union Street, Carrington Hotel
 HO184  423A-425A Victoria Street, Brunswick Park and oval
 HO193  Westbourne Street Precinct
 HO194  Weston Street Precinct
 HO233  191 Weston Street, Coppin Masonic Lodge

Heritage sites in Melbourne
+
City of Merri-bek